The gracilis velvet gecko (Oedura gracilis) is a gecko endemic to Western Australia.

References

Oedura
Reptiles described in 1985
Taxa named by Max King (herpetologist)
Geckos of Australia